KNUW is a radio station airing an News/Talk format licensed to Santa Clara, New Mexico, broadcasting on 95.1 MHz FM. The station serves the Silver City, New Mexico area and most of Grant County, New Mexico, and is owned by Duran-Hill, Inc.

References

External links

Adult hits radio stations in the United States
NUW